Fresh Horses is a 1988 American coming-of-age drama film directed by David Anspaugh, and starring Andrew McCarthy and Molly Ringwald.

Plot
Cincinnati college senior Matt Larkin seems to have a picture-perfect life: he comes from a well-to-do family, he is well-liked at his college, from which he is soon to graduate, and has a fiancée, friends, parties, and good times. When Matt meets Jewel, though, his carefully constructed house of cards falls apart and changes him forever.

Matt is content with his very proper fiancée and his safe life, so when his best friend Tipton relates a story of a night spent in a rough country house filled with seedy characters, beer, music, and women, Matt initially scoffs at the idea of visiting, but as he ponders his imminent marriage, he decides to check it out–no harm done, just a little fun before life gets serious.

The two drive out to the house, expecting a wild party. Instead, they find only the aftermath of the previous night—cigarette butts and bottles strewn everywhere, a solitary biker playing pool, and a woman's muffled giggle coming from upstairs. Disappointed, Matt goes to fetch a beer for Tipton and in doing so, in the kitchen, meets Jewel.

Jewel is all mystery and trailer park at the same time. She's a poor Kentucky girl, obviously uneducated, yet Matt is instantly drawn to her. He returns to seek her out and the attraction they share is obvious. Despite their social differences, Matt is completely infatuated.

His life soon does a 180. He breaks off his engagement, sneaks out at night, and stops seeing his friends.  Matt has yet to figure out who exactly Jewel is, and discovers the secrets she is hiding (including an abusive husband and stepfather, the shady people who hang around the house, as well as the fact she is underaged).

As a result, the two worlds collide, and they seemingly are doomed by circumstance. After Matt has a run-in with Jewel's spouse, the ultra-seedy Green, Matt and Jewel break up. Jewel separates from Green and Matt takes a job in Chicago. A year later, Matt returns home to visit his family for Christmas, he runs into Jewel who has since divorced her husband, obtained her GED, and is now attending a trade school to pursue a career in nursing and make a better life for herself, she has also met a new man at her school. The two wish each other well and the film ends as they both walk away.

Cast

 Molly Ringwald as Jewel
 Andrew McCarthy as Matt Larkin
 Patti D'Arbanville as Jean
 Ben Stiller as Tipton
 Leon Russom as Kyle Larkin
 Molly Hagan as Ellen
 Viggo Mortensen as Green
 Doug Hutchison as Sproles
 Dan Davis as Fletcher
 John Powell as himself
 Zack Stickles as himself

Original play
The film was based on a play by Larry Ketron. It debuted on 11 February 1986 Off Broadway at the WPA Theatre in New York starring Craig Sheffer and Suzy Amis. Dann Florek directed and the cast also included Mark Benninghofen, John Bowman, Marissa Chibas, Alice Haining and Havilland Morris.

Frank Rich of the New York Times wrote that the play:
Is more a collection of lively scenes and funny speeches than a sustained work; it doesn't so much come to a point as slow to a halt. But the evening is highly entertaining along its way -far more so than other Ketron plays, largely set in the same milieu, that have appeared at the WPA and elsewhere over the past decade. If this playwright writes rather formlessly – and can still hand inarticulate characters erudite authorial pronouncements – he has finally perfected the pitch of his comic voice. That voice is not the Deep Southern belt of Eudora Welty... but the twang of the modern border states, where new money has eroded Dixie tradition and landscape alike.
Amis' performance in particular was much praised.

Production
Film rights were bought by Weintraub Entertainment, a new company from Jerry Weintraub. It would be their first production (although they distributed The Big Blue.)

"It's a passionate love story", said Ringwald. "He's a yuppie, a young guy engaged to be married. He meets me -- uneducated, almost illiterate, sexy, complex, dangerous. So mismatched they can never work out, but they're in love."

She added it was "very dark story about two very different people. It's like a love story that was doomed from the beginning. There's a lot more layers and the character goes into a lot more depth than the other characters I've done."

Her fee was reportedly between $500,000 and $1 million.

Ringwald and Andrew McCarthy had previously played mismatched lovers in Pretty in Pink and Ringwald admitted, "It was a big question in all our minds before we started the film. Are people going to see this as Pretty in Pink II? It's stupid, I'm a good actress and he's a good actor and we're good together. Once we dove in and started working, Pretty in Pink never came up."

"I think you have to use your imagination to a large degree", she said about her character. "I've never been raped. I didn't grow up the way she did. I had to use research, meet people, look through pictures. Just get a feel for it and use your imagination. Jewel is not as educated as I am, but she knows exactly what's going on."

Filming started in Cincinnati on 9 November 1987.

Filming locations in Kentucky included Campbell, Kenton, Boone and Gallatin Counties, and the city of Warsaw; In Ohio, the University of Cincinnati, the city of Cincinnati, Americana Amusement Park LeSourdsville Lake in Monroe, Ohio and Kings Island  amusement park, then in Deerfield Township, Warren County, Ohio, now in Mason; and Switzerland County, Indiana.

"It was cold", said McCarthy. "There's the whole starkness up there; it helped the mood of the movie."

Reception

Critical reaction
In his review for the Los Angeles Times, Michael Wilmington said, "[t]here's a lot to admire in the film adaptation of Larry Ketron's play 'Fresh Horses'" and called the dialogue "fresh, sad and funny." He also praised the work of director Anspaugh and cinematographer Fred Murphy, saying they give the movie "a very distinctive look: moody and poetic, grainy and wistful, drenched with a sad, faraway, forget-me-not drizzle of passion and regrets." However, he concluded that the "movie refuses to jell." Fresh Horses holds a 0% rating on Rotten Tomatoes based on six reviews.

"Good on them for trying", said Filmink.

Box office
The film performed poorly, earning $3,074,292 in the opening weekend, and a total of $6,640,346 domestically – only 46.3% of the total gross, failing to recoup its $14 million budget.

References

External links
 
 
 

1988 films
1980s coming-of-age drama films
American coming-of-age drama films
American films based on plays
Columbia Pictures films
Films directed by David Anspaugh
Films scored by David Foster
Films scored by Patrick Williams
Films set in Kentucky
Films set in Cincinnati
Films shot in Indiana
Films shot in Kentucky
Films shot in Ohio
Weintraub Entertainment Group films
1988 drama films
1980s English-language films
1980s American films